Colombian singer Maluma has released five studio albums, one mixtape, two extended play, ninety-one singles (including thirty-two as a featured artist), and ten promotional singles.

Albums

Studio albums

Soundtrack albums

Mixtapes

EPs

Singles

As lead artist

As featured artist

Promotional singles

Other charted songs

Other appearances

Notes

Videography

Footnotes

References

Maluma
Discographies of Colombian artists